Kim Jin-kyu (born 1985) is a South Korean football player.

Kim Jin-kyu may also refer to:
Kim Jin-kyu (actor) (1922–1998)
Kim Jin-kyu (footballer, born 1997)